Pteron (Gr. πτερον – pteron — wing) is an architectural term used by Pliny the Elder for the peristyle of the tomb of Mausolus, which was raised on a lofty podium, and so differed from an ordinary peristyle raised only on a stylobate, as in ancient Greek temples, or on a low podium, as in Roman temples.

Notes

References

Ancient Roman architectural elements